José Márcio Pereira da Silva  (born 17 November 1948), better known in the United States as Zequinha is a Brazilian former footballer, who played in Brazil and the United States.

Biography
Born in Leopoldina, Minas Gerais, Zequinha started his career in 1967 at Flamengo and he left to play for Botafogo two years later. After six season there, he then made the transfer to Grêmio in 1975 and stayed on for three years, before moving to São Paulo FC for one season.

With the popularity of the North American Soccer League at its zenith, Zequinha moved to the U.S. and joined the Dallas Tornado in 1979. Rather than go home during the off-season, he chose to play indoor soccer in the MISL for the Detroit Lightning. He played two more years in Dallas before the team was merged with the Tampa Bay Rowdies after the 1981 season. After two indoor and one outdoor season with the Rowdies he joined the Tulsa Roughnecks and was a member of their Soccer Bowl winning side in 1983. From there he moved back to MISL, playing indoors for the Tacoma Stars. He finished out his career in the USL, first with the Dallas Americans in 1984, then with the Tulsa Tornados in 1985. It was in the indoor game that he had his greatest success while in the U.S. He was a member of Tampa Bay's 1983 indoor Grand Prix winning side, scoring the game-tying goal with 1:55 remaining in regulation to send the match to golden goal overtime.

References

External links
 NASL/MISL stats

Living people
1948 births
Association football forwards
Brazilian footballers
Brazilian expatriate footballers
Brazilian expatriate sportspeople in the United States
Brazil international footballers
Botafogo de Futebol e Regatas players
CR Flamengo footballers
Grêmio Foot-Ball Porto Alegrense players
São Paulo FC players
Dallas Americans players
Dallas Tornado players
Detroit Lightning players
Expatriate soccer players in the United States
Major Indoor Soccer League (1978–1992) players
North American Soccer League (1968–1984) indoor players
North American Soccer League (1968–1984) players
Tacoma Stars players
Tampa Bay Rowdies (1975–1993) players
Tulsa Roughnecks (1978–1984) players
Tulsa Tornados players
United Soccer League (1984–85) players